This is a list of public school districts in South Dakota, sorted alphabetically. It includes schools run by the Bureau of Indian Education but otherwise does not include non-traditional schools and school systems.

Public school districts

A
 Aberdeen School District
 Agar-Blunt-Onida School District
 Alcester-Hudson School District
 Andes Central School District
 Arlington School District
 Armour School District
 Avon School District

B
 Baltic School District
 Belle Fourche School District
 Bennett County School District
 Beresford School District
 Big Stone City School District
 Bison School District
 Bon Homme School District
 Bowdle School District
 Brandon Valley School District
 Bridgewater School District
 Britton-Hecla School District
 Brookings School District
 Burke School District

C
 Canistota School District
 Canton School District
 Castlewood School District
 Centerville School District
 Chamberlain School District
 Chester Area School District
 Cheyenne-Eagle Butte School (Eagle Butte School District)
 Clark School District
 Colman-Egan School District
 Colome Consolidated School District
 Corsica School District
 Custer School District

D
 Dakota Valley School District
 De Smet School District
 Dell Rapids School District
 Deubrook Area School District
 Deuel School District
 Doland School District
 Douglas School District
 Dupree School District

E
 Eagle Butte School District
 Edgemont School District
 Edmunds Central School District
 Elk Mountain School District
 Elk Point-Jefferson School District
 Elkton School District
 Emery School District
 Estelline School District
 Ethan School District
 Eureka School District

F
 Faith School District
 Faulkton Area School District
 Flandreau School District
 Florence School District
 Frederick Area School District
 Freeman School District

G
 Garretson School District
 Gayville-Volin School District
 Gettysburg School District
 Grant-Deuel School District
 Greater Hoyt School District
 Greater Scott School District
 Gregory School District
 Groton Area School District

H
 Haakon School District
 Hamlin School District
 Hanson School District
 Harding County School District
 Harrisburg School District
 Henry School District
 Herreid School District
 Highmore-Harrold School District
 Hill City School District
 Hitchcock-Tulare School District
 Hot Springs School District
 Hoven School District
 Howard School District
 Hurley School District
 Huron School District

I
 Ipswich Public School District
 Irene-Wakonda School District
 Iroquois School District
 Isabel School District

J
 Jones County School District

K
 Kadoka Area School District
 Kimball School District

L
 Lake Preston School District
 Langford School District
 Lead-Deadwood School District
 Lemmon School District
 Lennox School District
 Leola School District
 Lyman School District

M
 Madison Central School District
 Marion School District
 McCook Central School District
 McIntosh School District
 McLaughlin School District
 Meade School District
 Menno School District
 Milbank School District
 Miller Area School District
 Mitchell School District
 Mobridge-Pollock School District
 Montrose School District
 Mount Vernon School District

N
 New Underwood School District
 Newell School District
 Northwestern Area School District

O
 Oelrichs School District
 Oldham-Ramona School District

P
 Parker School District
 Parkston School District
 Pierre School District
 Plankinton School District
 Platte-Geddes School District

R
 Rapid City Area School District
 Redfield School District
 Rosholt School District
 Roslyn School District
 Rutland School District

S
 Sanborn Central School District School Website
 Scotland School District
 Selby Area School District
 Shannon County School District
 Sioux Falls School District
 Sioux Valley School District
 Sisseton School District
 Smee School District
 South Central School District
 Spearfish School District
 Stanley County School District
 Stickney School District
 Summit School District

T
 Tea Area School District
 Timber Lake School District
 Todd County School District
 Tripp-Delmont School District
 Tri-Valley School District

V
 Vermillion School District
 Viborg School District

W
 Wagner Community School District
 Wall School District
 Warner School District
 Watertown School District
 Waubay School District
 Waverly School District
 Webster School District
 Wessington Springs School District
 West Central School District
 White Lake School District
 White River School District
 Willow Lake School District
 Wilmot School District
 Winner School District
 Wolsey-Wessington School District
 Wood School District
 Woonsocket School District

Y
 Yankton School District

Bureau of Indian Education schools and school systems

A
 American Horse School

C
 Cheyenne River BIA Schools
 Crazy Horse School
 Crow Creek Sioux Tribal School

E
 Enemy Swim Day School

F
 Flandreau Indian School

L
 Little Wound School System
 Loneman School Corporation
 Lower Brule School System

M
 Marty Indian School

P
 Pierre Indian Learning Center
 Pine Ridge School
 Porcupine Contract School

R
 Rock Creek Day School

S
 Saint Francis Indian School
 Sitting Bull School

T
 Takini School
 Tiospa Zina Tribal School
 Tiospaye Topa School System

W
 Wounded Knee School System

References
 Complete List of South Dakota School Districts, retrieved 2010-02-19

South Dakota
School districts
School districts